
Gmina Przodkowo is a rural gmina (administrative district) in Kartuzy County, Pomeranian Voivodeship, in northern Poland.

Villages
Gmina Przodkowo contains the villages and settlements of Bagniewo, Barwik, Bielawy, Brzeziny, Buczyno, Bursztynik, Czarna Huta, Czeczewo, Gliniewo, Hejtus, Hopy, Kawle Dolne, Kawle Górne, Kczewo, Kłosówko, Kłosowo, Kłosowo-Piekło, Kłosowo-Wybudowanie, Kobysewo, Kosowo, Krzywda, Masłowo, Młynek, Nowe Tokary, Osowa Góra, Otalżyno, Piekiełko, Pomieczyno, Pomieczyno Małe, Przodkowo, Przodkowo Działki, Przodkowo-Wybudowanie, Rąb, Smołdzino, Sośniak, Stanisławy, Szarłata, Tokarskie Pnie, Tokary, Trzy Rzeki, Warzenko, Warzeńska Huta, Wilanowo, Załęskie Piaski and Załęże.

Neighbouring gminas
Gmina Przodkowo is bordered by the gminas of Kartuzy, Szemud and Żukowo.

References
Polish official population figures 2006

Przodkowo
Kartuzy County